Fogo sobre Terra is a Brazilian telenovela produced and broadcast by TV Globo. It premiered on 8 May 1974 and ended on 4 January 1975, with a total of 209 episodes in Black and white. It's the fourteenth "novela das oito" to be aired on the timeslot. It is created and written by Janete Clair and directed by Walter Avancini and Daniel Filho.

Cast 
 Juca de Oliveira - Pedro Fonseca (Pedro Azulão)
 Regina Duarte - Bárbara Gonzaga
 Dina Sfat - Francisca Peixoto Martins (Chica Martins)
 Jardel Filho - Diogo
 Neuza Amaral - Nara
 Fúlvio Stefanini - Gustavo de Almeida
 Edson França - Nilo Gato
 Marcos Paulo - André
 Sônia Braga - Brisa
 Herval Rossano - Arthur Braga
 Gilberto Martinho - Zé Martins
 Aracy Cardoso - Dra. Lisa
 Ida Gomes - Frida
 Dary Reis - Tonho
 Léa Garcia - Tiana
 Jayme Barcellos - Dr. Heitor Gonzaga
 Darcy de Souza - Ivone
 Germano Filho - Quebra-Galho
 Tamara Taxman - Jamile
 Isaac Bardavid - Salin
 Tony Ferreira - Delegado Amaro
 Lícia Magna - Isabel
 Ênio Santos - Juliano
 Françoise Forton - Estrada de Ferro
 Maria Zilda Bethlem - Maria Fumaça
 Roberto Bomfim - Saul
 Mary Daniel - Dona Hilda Maria
 Jorge Cherques - Coronel João Aires de Brito
 Edson Silva - Kalin
 Ada Chaseliov - Maria Paula
 Monique Lafond - Judi
 Hélio Ary - Custódio
 Lourdinha Bittencourt - Sueli
 Rosana Garcia - Vivi
 Ricardo Garcia Costa - Ônibus
 José Miziara - Amadeu
 Dartagnan Mello - Bicho Brabo
 Regina Linhares - Mimi
 Carapanã - Tamaê

References

External links 
 

TV Globo telenovelas
1974 telenovelas
Brazilian telenovelas
1974 Brazilian television series debuts
1975 Brazilian television series endings
Portuguese-language telenovelas